Plantagenet Wines is an Australian winery based at Mount Barker, in the Great Southern wine region of Western Australia.  It includes Bouverie Vineyard in Denbarker, the first commercial vineyard to be planted in the region.

See also
 Australian wine
 List of wineries in Western Australia
 Western Australian wine

References

Notes

Bibliography

External links

 – official site

Great Southern (Western Australia)
Wineries in Western Australia
1968 establishments in Australia
Food and drink companies established in 1968